Antoine Laurent de Jussieu (12 April 1748 – 17 September 1836) was a French botanist, notable as the first to publish a natural classification of flowering plants; much of his system remains in use today. His classification was based on an extended unpublished work by his uncle, the botanist Bernard de Jussieu.

Life 

Jussieu was born in Lyon, France, in 1748, as one of 10 children, to Christophle de Jussieu, an amateur botanist. His father's three younger brothers were also botanists. He went to Paris in 1765 to be with his uncle Bernard and to study medicine, graduating with a doctorate in 1770, with a thesis on animal and vegetable physiology. His uncle introduced him to the Jardin du Roi, where he was appointed as a botany Demonstrator and deputy to L. G. Le Monnier, professor of botany there in 1770. Le Monnier had succeeded Antoine-Laurent's uncle Antoine in 1759. Lectures by eminent botanists, including the Jusssieu dynasty were popular there, especially among pharmacists. His lecture on the classification of Ranunculaceae in 1773 to the Académie des Sciences led to his election as a member that year. In 1784 he was appointed to a Royal Commission by Louis XVI, as one of five commissionaires to investigate animal magnetism, publishing a dissenting opinion from the majority, suggesting further investigation was required.

The publication of Jussieu's Genera plantarum in 1789 was rapidly followed by the outbreak of the French Revolution (1789–1799). Jussieu adhered to the revolutionary principles and was appointed to a position in the municipal government of Paris, where he had the task of managing all the hospitals. With the overthrow of the monarchy, the Jardin du Roi was renamed the Jardin des plantes, and Jussieu was instrumental in reorganizing the Jardin as the Muséum national d'histoire naturelle in 1790, where he became a professor of botany, holding the chair in Botanique à la campagne. He was also Director of the museum from 1794 to 1795, and again from 1798 to 1800. Jussieu immediately set about setting up a herbarium, a task greatly facilitated by the seizure  of foreign collections by the revolutionary armies, and by the confiscation of the assets of the church and aristocracy. In 1808, Napoleon appointed him to the position of counsellor of the university.

He remained at the museum until 1826, when he was succeeded by his son Adrien-Henri. At the museum he published many papers in the museum's annals (Annales du Museum d’histoire naturelle 1802–1813) and its succeeding Mémoires du Muséum d'histoire naturelle (1815–), as well as contributing articles to Frederic Cuvier's Dictionnaire des sciences naturelles (1816-1830). He was also a member of the Masonic Lodge, Les Neuf Sœurs.

Work 

Jussieu's system of plant classification, based on the relative value of their characteristics, served as the basis for natural systems of taxonomy. His system was first published in a paper on Ranunculaceae in 1773. The following year he developed the concept further in a paper on the arrangement of plants in the Jardin de Roi, based on the work of his uncle Bernard at the Trianon garden in Versaille. The work dealt primarily with suprafamilial ranks of classification. The following five years were devoted to applying his ideas to the entire plant kingdom, culminating in his epochal work, the Genera plantarum (1789). In preparing this work he had access to a large number of herbaria and botanical gardens. Although at first British and German botanists, firm adherents of the Linnaean system, were wary of what they considered radical ideas emanating from the French revolution, the work soon gained wide acceptance in scientific circles, and was actively promoted by eminent botanists including Robert Brown and A. P. de Candolle. 

In the Genera plantarum (1789), Jussieu adopted a methodology based on the use of multiple characters to define groups, an idea derived from naturalist Michel Adanson. This was a significant improvement over the "artificial" system of Linnaeus, whose most popular work classified plants into classes and orders based on the number of stamens and pistils, though Jussieu did keep Linnaeus' binomial nomenclature. He extended his uncle's ideas about the value of the characteristics of plants. These characteristics were considered to be of unequal value, with some subordinate to others in a hierarchical system. As Jusssieu put it, plant characteristics should be pesés et non comptés (weighed, not counted), in assigning each to a definite group. The names he gave to his uncle's three major groupings were Acotyledon, Monocotyledon, and Dicotyledon. These were then divided into fifteen classes and one hundred families. The most important features of the Genera plantarum are the division into groups and the description and circumscription of the 100 families (ordines naturales). With the resumption of his scientific work at the museum, Jussieu's publications (some 60 memoirs) largely dealt with further elaborating the principles of the Genera plantarum and more detailed circumscription and description of the families he had named, work that was very much influenced by Joseph Gärtner. Although he worked on a second edition of Genera plantarum, all that was published was his Introductio, posthumously in 1837.

List of selected publications 

Sources: ; ; 
 1770 : 
 1773 : 
 1774 : 
 1784 : 
 1789 : 
 
 1804: 
 1810: 
 1824: , reprinted from F. Cuvier, ed., Dictionnaire des sciences naturelles, 30: 426–468 (1824)
 1837 :  op. post.

Recurrent publications
 Notice historique sur le Museum d’histoire naturelle, in Annales du Museum d’histoire naturelle, 1 (1802), 1–14; 2 (1803), 1–16; 3 (1804), 1–17; 4 (1804), 1–19; 6 (1805), 1-20; 11 (1808), 1-41

Awards and memberships 

Member of the French Académie des Sciences (1773), elected foreign member of the Royal Swedish Academy of Sciences (1788).

Legacy 

Jussieu's "natural" system of classification soon replaced the artificial sexual one of Linnaeus. The system of suprageneric nomenclature in botany is officially dated to 4 Aug 1789 with the publication of the Genera Plantarum (Gen. Pl.). The Genera plantarum was far-reaching in its impact; many of the present-day plant families are still attributed to Jussieu. Morton's 1981 History of botanical science counts 76 of Jussieu's families conserved in the ICBN, versus just 11 for Linnaeus, for instance. Writing of the natural system, Sydney Howard Vines remarked: 

De Jussieu and his family have been commemorated by a number of images, including a bust and medallion by David d'Angers (Pierre-Jean David), upon his death. A statue of Jussieu, commissioned for 10,000 Fr by Jean-François Legendre-Héral in 1842, stands in the Galerie de Botanique of the Jardin des Plantes. Another, by Jean-Baptiste Gustave Deloye is on the balustrade of the Natural History Museum, Vienna (facing Maria-Theresien-Platz). The Jussieu botanical dynasty is commemorated in the neighbourhood of the Jardin des Plantes by the Place Jussieu, (Quartier Saint-Victor, 5th arrondissement) Rue Jussieu, the Jussieu metro station and the Jussieu science campus of the University of Paris. The Jussieu family are also commemorated by street names in Marseilles and Lyon, their family home. The Jussieu Peninsula in South Australia is also named after Antoine Laurent Jussieu, as is an asteroid.

See also 
 De Jussieu system
 History of botany
 Royal Commission on Animal Magnetism
 :Category:Taxa named by Antoine Laurent de Jussieu

Notes

References

Bibliography

Books

Historical sources 

 
 
 
 
 
 
 ,

Articles

Encyclopaedias

Websites

External links  
 List of publications at Biodiversity Heritage Library

1748 births
1836 deaths
Scientists from Lyon
18th-century French botanists
French Roman Catholics
Members of the French Academy of Sciences
Members of the Royal Swedish Academy of Sciences
Foreign Members of the Royal Society
Les Neuf Sœurs
19th-century French botanists